Automatic Centre was the oldest appliance and electronics retail store in the Philippines.  Started in 1948 by Benito Lim, the company had grown from a single store to a multiple store and multiple format retail operation.

History
Prior to the Japanese occupation of the Philippines, the Lim was family engaged in the furniture business, with three of the biggest furniture stores in the Philippines then. The businesses, however, had to be closed down due to World War II, and a buy-and-sell frenzy took over.

Mr. Benito Lim began trading in the basic necessities: toothpaste, toilet paper, soap, clothespins, and such other household items. All this hard work, however, was razed down to the ground with the coming of the American Liberation Forces.

He put up another store, a wine shop called Esquire Wine Dealer that catered to the GIs who roamed the ravaged streets of Manila. But the Americans soon pulled out and demand for whiskey declined. The 24-year-old Lim then set up an electrical supplies store, which was to be the foundation of Automatic Centre.

Automatic Electrical Appliances
Automatic Electrical Appliances was born in 1948 in a 40-square-meter store at Avenida Rizal, post-war Manila’s main shopping street. It sold light bulbs, wires, sockets, and other electrical supplies.

News was a prime commodity then (after the news blackout of the Japanese era) and there was a huge demand for radios. Mr. Benito Lim read that American Factors, a radio manufacturer, was looking for dealers for their radios. He applied for a dealership; consequently, American Factors looked up his place and consigned five radios to him at no deposit.

He replenished his stocks soon enough, approached one manufacturer after another.

In 1964, Automatic Appliances set up a 200-square-meter branch at the Makati Commercial Center, the country's first major commercial center. Pioneering the concept of appliance supermarket-ing, the store carried all of the major brands at that time: GE, Sony, Carrier, and Admiral, among others.

That store evolved into a 3,400-square-meter showroom called Automatic Centre, which opened in 1977. It introduced Blims Fine Furniture which became an integral section of the store. To date, Automatic Centre has 19 stores across the country, with stores situated at shopping malls.

Blims Fine Furniture
Blims Fine Furniture was conceived to be a one-stop shop for home and office furniture and furnishings. It launched the Ready-To-Use (RTU) furniture concept which has since become the industry standard in purchasing furniture. Blims Fine Furniture was also the first furniture retailer in the Philippines to introduce modern seating for offices -the ergonomic chair. It has also since then included among its product lines brands such as La-Z-Boy from the United States, ID-Design from Denmark, Novikos from Italy, and Diethelm from Singapore.

Collins International Trading Corporation
In 1980, Automatic Centre set up Collins International Trading Corporation to act as its distribution arm. Collins International has since been a distributor of global brands such as the genuine Thermos brand (USA), Sharp (Japan), Timex (USA), Marathon (Korea), Camping Gaz (France), Dowell (various), Omron (Japan), and Moulinex (France).

Goldstar-Collins Phils., Inc.
In 1986, The Automatic Centre Group entered into a joint venture with GoldStar.

The Goldstar-Collins plant in the city of Pasig is apex of Automatic Centre's backward integration from retailing and wholesaling to distribution and manufacturing. Goldstar-Collins itself was bestowed the Golden Shell Award by then President Fidel V. Ramos in 1993.

Closure
Due to losses caused by the COVID-19 pandemic, the chain closed down all of its stores on October 10, 2021, although its owners are looking for investors to adopt the Automatic Centre brand.

Rebranding and reopening
Some of its major branches, such as in Gateway Mall and Ali Mall at Araneta City, were reopened a month after its closure.

Concept stores

At the start of the 21st century, Automatic Centre opened its new concept stores that focused more on gadgets and top-of-the-line LCDs, home theatre systems and the like to serve the more technology conscious market in trendy shopping centers.

It also opened more concept stores that catered to electronics and gadgets at three locations: The Automatic Centre T3 at TriNoma 3/F, Automatic Centre G4 at Glorietta 4, and the Automatic Centre Digital Plaza at Gateway Mall.

In May 2008, Automatic Centre opened its grandest store to date – the 10,000 square meter Automatic SUPERCentre at the heart of Araneta Center in Quezon City.

In 2016, Automatic Centre opened the doors to its newest location at the Sta. Lucia Mall in Cainta, Rizal, its first in the Region 4-A area.

In May 2018, the company started to venture into eCommerce by converting its website into an online store.

In mid-2019, Automatic Centre merged two of its Glorietta 4 stores to a new location in Glorietta 1, which was the former location of the National Bookstore's third floor store in the said mall. The company also is in preparations to open a new store in Ayala Malls Manila Bay, its first store in the Parañaque area.

References

Retail companies of the Philippines
Retail companies established in 1948
Companies based in Makati